The 2017 USAC Silver Crown Champ Car Series presented by Traxxas season is the 46th season of the USAC Silver Crown Series. The series began with the Sumar Classic at the Terre Haute Action Track on April 2, and will end with the 4 Crown Nationals at Eldora Speedway on September 23. Chris Windom entered the 2017 season as the defending champion. Kody Swanson won the 2017 season championship driving for DePalma Motorsports in the #63 Maxim / Hampshire Chevrolet.

Team and Driver chart

Schedule
The 2017 schedule features 6 dirt ovals and 5 pavement ovals including a historic return to Phoenix International Raceway after an 8-year absence. The entire season will be broadcast on-demand by Loudpedal.TV. Select races were broadcast live by Speed Shift TV. BCSN2 broadcast the Toledo race on tape delay.

Schedule notes and changes
 - the Hoosier Hundred at the Indiana State Fairgrounds Mile was canceled due to weather.

Results and Standings

Races

References

USAC Silver Crown Series
United States Auto Club